Temnothorax inquilinus is a species of ant in the genus Temnothorax native to Ukraine.

First described as Chalepoxenus tauricus by Radchenko (1989), the species became a secondary junior homonym and given the replacement name Temnothorax inquilinus when Chalepoxenus was synonymized with Temnothorax by Ward et al. (2015).

References

External links

Hymenoptera of Europe
Endemic fauna of Ukraine
Insects described in 1989
Myrmicinae
Taxonomy articles created by Polbot
Taxobox binomials not recognized by IUCN